Cottbus Hauptbahnhof is one of the main railway stations of the German state of Brandenburg. It was called Cottbus station until 9 December 2018. It is located just south of central Cottbus. It is classified by Deutsche Bahn as a category 2 station.

History 

Cottbus station entered into operation on 13 September 1866 with the opening of the railway line from Berlin. In 1867, this line was extended to Görlitz. In 1870, the station building was inaugurated, located between the tracks as an "island station". In the following years, other railway lines were built in the region. The Großenhainer Bahnhof (the station serving trains to Großenhain) was opened on the Großenhain–Cottbus railway in 1873, north of the Berliner Bahnhof (the station serving trains to Berlin). In 1880, this station was closed and the trains were diverted to the Berlin station. The building of the Großenhainer Bahnhof still exists and serves the railway administration.

In 1886, the station's new owners, the Prussian state railways, built a tunnel to connect the platforms. To the north of the station there were originally freight facilities.

In 1899, the Spreewald Railway was opened with its terminus on the edge of the track field north of the state station.

By 1927 there were plans to build a new building on the southern side of the tracks because of the lack of space in the station building, which was confined on its island. However, these were not realised because of the Great Depression.

In February 1945, the station building and other parts of the station were destroyed in an air raid. After the war, a barracks-like building was built for passengers to replace the destroyed building. This provisional building remained for a long time and proved to be more and more inadequate. In the late 1960s, there were plans to build a new station building on the south side of the line. In 1970, the first preparations were made for its construction. As Cottbus was an important railway junction, especially for freight, because of the extensive lignite mining in the region, extensive preparations had to be made before the main construction could begin. These included the duplication of several lines in the Cottbus area, in order to relieve the junction. An additional platform was built. In 1974, work began on the new platform tunnel. Finally, after four years of construction, on 5 October 1978, the new station building went into operation.

On 30 September 1989, the Lübbenau–Cottbus line was electrified, including the tracks at Cottbus station. On 16 December 1989, electrification was extended to Finsterwalde on the Halle–Cottbus line. In 1990, it was extended to Senftenberg (on the Großenhain–Cottbus line) and Guben (Cottbus–Guben line).

In 1995, the National Garden Show (Bundesgartenschau) was held in Cottbus. On this occasion, the entrance building was extensively renovated and expanded.

At the end of November 2010, a new electronic interlocking system was put into operation at a cost of €50 million. Since then, all signals, switches and crossings in the area of Cottbus station have been controlled from the control centre at Berlin-Pankow.

Infrastructure 

The station is located south of central Cottbus on an east–west orientation. The original structure of the station as an island station can still be easily recognised by the large open area between the tracks. On this island some of the outbuildings of the temporary station built after the war have been preserved. Originally, the station was reached from Bahnhofstraße, which runs east of the station on a bridge over the tracks; there is now no connection from the bridge.

On the central island there are two platform edges on through tracks and some bay platforms on terminating tracks. The station building, built in the style of the 1970s, is on the southern side of the tracks. During the reconstruction a new "home platform" was created next to the new entrance building. Between the entrance building and the central island, there are two island platforms and another north of it.

During the reconstruction, a tunnel was built from the new station building to the middle island. The original station tunnel is located about 100 metres to its west. It starts on the platform that faces the current tracks 2 and 3 and links the platforms with each other and with the northern exit on the city side. It could not, however, be extended to the new station building. To get from the station building to the northernmost platform or the northern entrance, it is necessary to change tunnels. At the northern entrance there are no ticket facilities or waiting rooms. In front of its exit is the Spreewaldbahnhof, the starting point of the disused narrow gauge Spreewald Railway. Between the northern entrance and the platforms there are facilities for freight. These are for the most part no longer in operation, including the freight loading and unloading facilities and the container terminal.

The entrance building contains a ticket office, various dining facilities, a bookstore, and a shop selling local products. There are facilities for waiting in the heated concourse building.

Directly in front of the entrance building is the stop for tram lines 1 and 5 and some bus lines. Tram lines 2, 3 and 4 stop east of the station at the intersection of Bahnhofstraße and Stadtring.

Name

Until 2000 the station was the only passenger station in the city, so its name did not need to be distinguish it from other stations. Since then, a new stations has been built at Cottbus Sandow and the stations now known as Cottbus-Merzdorf and Cottbus-Willmersdorf Nord have had Cottbus added to their names. During the renovation of the station for the National Garden Show the name on the outside facade of the station was changed from Bahnhof Cottbus ("Cottbus station") to Cottbus Hauptbahnhof ("Cottbus central station"). Both the Verkehrsverbund Berlin-Brandenburg (Berlin-Brandenburg Transport Association) and the public transit system of Cottbus–Cottbusverkehr–call the station in their timetables Cottbus Hauptbahnhof. Officially the railway station, despite its importance, however, was still not known as Cottbus Hauptbahnhof. On 9 December 2018, its name was officially changed to Cottbus Hauptbahnhof.

Rail services 
The station has lost its former role as a long-distance transport junction. It is served only by one pair of long-distance trains.

The station is served by the following services:

Until mid-December 2014 the station was also served by EuroCity "Wawel", which used to run once daily between Hamburg-Altona and Wrocław Główny. This train was reinvented in December 2020 between Berlin Hauptbahnhof and Krakow Główny, but as the train is running on the electrified and faster route via Frankfurt (Oder), it does not stop in Cottbus Hbf anymore.

Future 

The station built during the renovation in the 1970s remained in many ways an inadequate station, partly because of its lack of continuous tunnels. Deutsche Bahn is planning the renovation of the station. All tracks and platforms of the passenger station are to be rebuilt and the signalling system is to be modernised. The modernisation is expected to cost almost €100 million.

At the end of 2008, DB Netz was requested by the Federal Railway Authority to demolish large parts of the infrastructure of the former container terminal on the north side of the station. The city of Cottbus plans an extension of Wilhelm-Külz-Straße on the site.

References

External links
 

Railway stations in Brandenburg
Buildings and structures in Cottbus
Railway stations in Germany opened in 1866
1866 establishments in Prussia